The Las Cajas water mouse (Chibchanomys orcesi) is a species of rodent in the family Cricetidae. It is endemic to the Cajas National Park in Ecuador. Its natural habitat is the high grassland (páramo) of the park, where it lives near streams, eating small fish and large invertebrates.

References

Chibchanomys
Mammals of Ecuador
Mammals described in 1997